Geroskipou Stadium is a small stadium in Geroskipou, which serves as the reserve home ground of Pafos FC.

References

Athletics (track and field) venues in Cyprus
Sports venues in Cyprus
Music venues in Cyprus
Football venues in Cyprus
Buildings and structures in Paphos District
Atromitos Yeroskipou